Tilt is an English group of electronic record producers, composed of Mick Park and Nic Britton.

Tilt was formed in Coventry, England by Mick Park and Mick Wilson.  In 1990, they became resident DJs at The Eclipse, which was the first legal all night rave dance venue in the United Kingdom.  During their time at Eclipse, they DJ'd alongside Sasha, who inspired them to produce their own musical material.  In 1993, they met with John Graham and formed Tilt. Engineered by Nic Britton at Bassroom/Midiroom Studios in Stoke-on-Trent, their first big hit single came in 1996 with "I Dream", released on Paul Oakenfold's Perfecto Records.  Tilt released several other singles such as "My Spirit", "Places", and "Butterfly", as well as "Rendezvous", which they recorded with Paul van Dyk.

Following this success, they were signed by Red Jerry's Hooj Choons label.  On Hooj Choons, they released "Invisible", which reached the Top 20 in the UK Singles Chart.  They also produced a cover version of Robert Miles' "Children".  Additionally, Tilt also released their "Dark Science EP" on Hooj Choons. Tilt Have had success with seven UK chart hits to date.

In 1997, the boys collaborated with the legendary Sex Pistols Manager Malcolm McLaren on a project called Lakme 'The Bell Song' - to critical acclaim. John Graham left Tilt in 1999 to pursue a solo production career, but Tilt, now a duo, continued to release singles.  Andy Moor then joined up with Parks and Wilson.  They released the album, Explorer, on a Hooj Choons subsidiary label, Lost Language.  Shortly after the album release, Moor and Wilson left the band to pursue their own careers. In 2011, Nic Britton re-joined Mick Park as TILT with releases on Black Hole Recordings

2011/12 - produced ‘No Other Day’ which featured Maria Nayler and re-released the classic ‘The World Doesn’t Know’ for Lost Language’s 100th release. Mick Park and Nic Britton hit the ground running with their huge remix of Cosmos ‘Take Me With You’ which was supported by Pete Tong on BBC Radio One and Steve Smart on Kiss (UK radio station). They have since collaborated with Ben Shaw, Sam Mollison and Dominique Atkins (aka) 'Grace' and have released productions on Mesmeric Records, Black Hole Recordings, Perfecto Records, Pro B-Tech and Lost Language all gaining DJ support from Carl Cox, John Digweed, Hernan Cattaneo, Nick Warren, Pete Tong, Armin Van Buuren, Paul Oakenfold plus many more. Late 2013 TILT released ‘Stop The World Revolving’ – Best of TILT; DJ Mix Compilation.

2014 started with a hive of activity producing an E.A.R (Electronic Artists Revealed) tutorial for Mac Pro. The video was an instant hit and TILT were invited back to produce another in 2017. Soon after work started on their highly anticipated album ‘Resonator’ which was signed to Pro B Tech Records, they collaborated with various singers and producers completing the project in 2014. Released in November 2014, it went straight to number 2 in the Beatport charts with critical acclaim from the world dance community. They toured to promote the project with a DJ & Live Visual show! 2015 then saw TILT release a four track EP entitled ‘Quad’ on Stripped Recordings. Fantastic reviews were received which culminated in TILT touring with Paul Oakenfold; DJing at sellout venues, which included Ministry of Sound, Cream (nightclub) and Session. Late 2015 saw TILT embarking on a monthly residency with Frisky Radio. TILT’s 'Trip Switch' showcased the hottest underground tunes over a one-hour mix. Feeling the need of a new challenge, TILT started work on a new studio production with long standing collaborators Natasha Cadman and Silinder. In October 2016, ‘Black Hearts’ was released on Pro B Tech Records hitting the Beatport top 10. More remixes followed with numerous reworks for the ‘hot’ Tactal Hots Music over the next few months.

In early 2017 TILT started a ‘House Music’ collaboration with the Queen of Soul and Gospel Music, Ms Ruby Turner (Jools Holland). This was Ruby’s first dance record production, which was named ‘Deeper In Love’. It was signed by Paul Oakenfold and released on Perfecto House Records in late 2017. In 2018 they released two brand new singles ‘Black Samurai’ and ‘Sinai’ on Tactal Hots Music.

2019, the guys remixed the biggest band in the worlds new single U2 ‘Summer of Love’ which has already had huge support from BBC Radio One, Paul Oakenfold, Rusty Egan and Solarstone - It was released on August 10th on Island Records / Universal Music Group - to date, Mick Park / TILT has remixed 5 projects for the Irish Rockers!

At the end of 2019 the guys decided to launch their own imprint record label / clothing brand ‘Guerilla Movement’. The first two runs of merchandise sold out immediately and they have already produced the debut release ‘Arabesque’ which is set for release late October. 2021/22 has been extremely busy; it started with remixing U2 ’Where the streets have no name’ for Bono himself. The guys have also started scoring the music for their first 'yet untitled' feature film. They have since go onto collaborate with Robbie Williams on several ideas for his new album and are about to embark on two more collaborations, this time with Happy Mondays front woman Rowetta and Inder Goldfinger (Ian Brown).

Selected discography

Albums
2005: Explorer (Lost Language)
2013: Stop the World Revolving (compilation) (Lost Language)
2014: Resonator (Pro B Tech Records)

Singles
1995: "I Dream" (UK #69) (Warner Music / Perfecto)
1997: "My Spirit" (UK #61) (Warner Music / Perfecto)
1997: "Places" (UK #64) (Warner Music / Perfecto)
1998: "Butterfly" (UK #41) (US #31) (feat. Zee) (Warner Music / Perfecto)
1999: "Children" (UK #51) (Deconstruction Records)
1999: "Invisible" (UK #20) (Hooj Choons)
1999: "Angry Skies" (TILT & Maria Nayler)(Deconstruction Records)
2000: Dark Science EP (UK #55) (Hooj Choons)
2002: "Headstrong" (feat. Maria Nayler) (Baroque Records)
2004: "The World Doesn't Know" (UK #36) (Lost Language)
2004: "Twelve" (Lost Language)
2011: The Century EP (Lost Language)
2013: "My Release" (feat. Maria Nayler) (Black Hole Recordings)
2013: "Here Is Not Now" (feat. Sam Mollison) (Pro B Tech Records)
2015: "30 Hits of Acid" (feat. G-Man) (Pro B Tech Records)

References

External links
Official Tilt website

UK Official Charts Company from Official Charts Company
US Chart stats from Billboard.com

Musical groups established in 1995
Musical groups from Coventry
English DJs
English electronic music groups
British trance music groups
Electronic dance music DJs